Legislative elections were held in French Polynesia on 23 May 1982 for the Territorial Assembly. Following the elections, a government was formed by Tahoera'a Huiraatira and Aia Api, who had won 16 of the 30 seats in the Assembly.

Campaign
A total of 398 candidates contested the elections representing around 30 parties and lists, of which fewer than 20 were women.

Results

Elected members

Aftermath
Following the elections, the Assembly elected members of the Government Council.

As members of the Government Council could not serve in the Assembly, several new members entered the Assembly as replacements: Ernest Teinauri of Tahoera'a Huiraatira replaced Jacques Teheiura; Franklin Brotherson, Roger Doom and Albert Taruoura of Tahoera'a Huiraatira replaced Gaston Flosse, Alexandre Léontieff and Charles Tetaria, while Terii Sanford of Aia Api replaced Sylvain Millaud. Sanford was also later elected the council and replaced by Yves Thunot.

John Teariki died in 1983, he was replaced by Jean-Baptiste Trouillet.

References

French
Legislative
Elections in French Polynesia
French
Election and referendum articles with incomplete results